The AACTA Award for Best Miniseries or Telefeature is an award that has been handed out to producers annually since 1986 by the Australian Film Institute (AFI), since 2011 the Australian Academy of Cinema and Television Arts (AACTA).

History
The award was originally presented by the AFI in two separate categories, for "Best Telefeature" and "Best Mini Series", but in 1990 both categories were merged to form Best Television Mini Series or Telefeature. By 2008 the award name was changed again, to AFI Award for Best Telefeature, Mini Series or Short Run Series.

From the inaugural AACTA awards in 2011 until 2020, the name was AACTA Award for Best Telefeature or Mini Series, changing to AACTA Award for Best Miniseries or Telefeature in 2021.

Best Mini Series

Best Telefeature

Best Miniseries or Telefeature (or Short Run Series)

See also
 Australian Film Institute
 AFI Awards
 AFI Television Awardsf

References

External links 
http://aacta.org/winners-nominees.aspx AACTA Award winners and nominees

T